Gareth Isherwood (born 28 November 1988, in Manchester) is a former motorcycle speedway rider from Cadishead, Salford, Greater Manchester.

Career
He rode for three National league clubs since 2005 in which was his debut season. They are Scunthorpe, Stoke Potters and Buxton Hitmen. In 2008, whilst riding for Buxton, Isherwood won the Gold Cup award which was awarded to their best rider.

In the 2011 season he rode for Stoke Potters.

References

Living people
1988 births
People from Salford
British speedway riders
Buxton Hitmen riders
Stoke Potters riders